Palaeorhincodon is an extinct genus of prehistoric whale shark from the Paleocene and Eocene. Fossil teeth and vertebrae, the only shark body parts consisting of bone that typically fossilize, have been found in Africa, Asia, Europe, and North America. This extinct genus is believed to have been larger on average than the modern whale shark, reaching up to 18 meters in length and weighing over 45 tonnes.

Rhincodontidae
Paleocene fish
Eocene fish
Prehistoric fish of Africa